See Beautiful Rattlesnake Gardens is the debut album by American alternative country band The Walkabouts released in 1988 through PopLlama Records.

Track listing
All tracks written by The Walkabouts, except where noted.

 "Jumping Off" – 2:59
 "Breakneck Speed" – 3:07
 "The Wellspring" – 3:44
 "John Reilly" – 3:38
 "Robert McFarlane Blues" – 0:54
 "This Rotten Tree" – 2:06
 "Laughingstock" – 3:34
 "Glass Palace" – 3:01
 "Feast or Famine" – 4:22
 "Ballad of Moss Head" – 2:47
 "Who-Knows-What" – 4:15
 "Rattlesnake Theme" – 1:15

Weights and Rivers (the bonus tracks) (Glitterhouse re-release, 1993)
 "Linda Evans" – 4:12
 "Mai Tai Time" – 2:02
 "Cyclone" – 3:51
 "Gather Round" (Arthur Lee) – 4:40
 "Certain Gift" – 4:05

The length of the Glitterhouse re-release is 54:32 minutes. 
According to the Glitterhouse re-release CD liner notes the tracks 13-16 were compiled from the unreleased "Weights & Rivers" album. "Linda Evans" b/ w "Cyclone" was originally released as a 7" single by Necessity Records (Spring 1987, S001). "Certain Gift" appeared originally on the compilation Sounds of Young Seattle, Vol. II (Dust Bunnie/Necessity, Spring 1986) on cassette only. The re-release was released on September 17, 1993.

Personnel 
 Michael Wells – bass, harmonica, vocals
 Carla Torgerson – vocals, guitar, keyboard, cello
 Grant Eckman – drums, percussion
 Chris Eckman – vocals, guitar, moss organ

Additional musicians
 Terry Lee Hale – lead guitar on "This Rotten Tree", acoustic lead guitar on "Gather Round"
 Alan Goodman – lap steel guitar on "Jumping off"
 Nancy Clark – violin on "Breakneck Speed"
 Tony Kroes – noise and treatments (according to the Glitterhouse re-release CD liner notes)
 Curt Eckman – bass on "Certain Gift"
 Dylan Thomas – voice over on "Certain Gift"

The Glitterhouse re-release CD liner notes also mention a "cast of Belltown drunks" (including Gary Heffern) on backup vocals on "Gather Round".

Technical
 The Walkabouts – production
 Tony Kroes – production on all tracks, engineering on "Certain Gift"
 Ed Brooks – production & engineering on 1-12
 Bruce Calder – production & engineering on "Linda Evans", "Mai Tai Time", "Cyclone" "Gather Round"
 Ben Thompson - Cover design, lettering, and photography
 Chris Peters - Cover woodcut

References

1988 debut albums
The Walkabouts albums
PopLlama Records albums